The Kir is a French cocktail made with a measure of crème de cassis (blackcurrant liqueur) topped up with white wine.

In France it is usually drunk as an apéritif before a meal or snack. It was originally made with Bourgogne Aligoté, a white wine of Burgundy, but today various white wines are used throughout France, according to the region and the barkeeper. Many prefer a white Chardonnay-based Burgundy, such as Chablis.

It used to be called blanc-cassis, but it is now named after Félix Kir (1876–1968), mayor of Dijon in Burgundy. Kir was a pioneer of the twinning movement in the aftermath of the Second World War, and popularized the drink by offering it at receptions to visiting delegations.  Besides treating his international guests well, he was also promoting two economic products of the region.  Kir allowed one of Dijon's producers of crème de cassis to use his name, then extended the right to their competitors as well.  According to Rolland (2004), the reinvention of blanc-cassis (post 1945) was necessitated by the German Army's confiscation of all the local red Burgundy during the war. Faced with an excess of white wine, Kir renovated a drink that used to be made primarily with the red.

Another explanation that has been offered is that Mayor Kir revived it during a year in which the ordinary white wine of the region was inferior and the crème de cassis helped to disguise the fact.

Following the commercial development of crème de cassis in 1841, the cocktail became a popular regional café drink, but has since become inextricably linked internationally with the name of Mayor Kir.  When ordering a Kir, waiters in France sometimes ask whether the customer wants it made with crème de cassis (blackcurrant), de mûre (blackberry), de pêche (peach), or framboise (raspberry).

The International Bartenders Association gives a recipe using 1/10 crème de cassis, but French sources typically specify more; 19th-century recipes for blanc-cassis recommended 1/3 crème de cassis, which modern tastes find cloyingly sweet, and modern sources typically about 1/5.  Replacing the crème de cassis with blackcurrant syrup is discouraged.

Variations
Besides the basic Kir, a number of variations exist:

 Cidre royal – made with cider instead of wine, with a measure of calvados added
 Communard, or cardinal – made with red wine instead of white
 Hibiscus royal – made with sparkling wine, peach liqueur, raspberry liqueur, and an edible hibiscus flower
 Kir Berrichon – from the Berry region of France. Made with red wine and blackberry liqueur (crème de mûre)
 Kir bianco – made with sweet white Vermouth instead of wine.
 Kir Breton – made with Breton cider instead of wine.
 Kir impérial – made with raspberry liqueur (such as Chambord) instead of cassis, and champagne
 Kir Normand – made with Normandy cider instead of wine.
 Kir pamplemousse – made with red grapefruit liqueur and sparkling white wine
 Kir pêche – made with peach liqueur
 Kir pétillant – made with sparkling wine
 Kir royal – made with Champagne
 Pink Russian – made with milk instead of wine
 Tarantino – made with lager or light ale ("kir-beer")

References

Cocktails with wine
Cocktails with liqueur